Ndivhuwo Elaine Mukheli (born 2 April 1999), known mononymously as Elaine, is a South African R&B singer and songwriter from Pretoria. While studying law at the University of the Witwatersrand, she self-released her debut EP Elements in September 2019. The EP reached No. 1 on both the national iTunes and Apple Music album charts, making her the first independent female artist to do so.Elements was certified Platinum by RISA a year after its initial release and was nominated for Best R&B/Soul Album at the 26th South African Music Awards. Elaine was subsequently signed to Columbia Records in December 2020.

Early life

1999–2018: early years 

Ndivhuwo Elaine Mukheli was born in Pretoria on 2 April 1999. She started singing at age six and participated in the school choir and various talent competitions while growing up. In 2014 she received a gold medal at the 8th World Choir Games in Riga, Latvia. While attending high school, Mukheli began writing her own music. She began studying law at University of the Witwatersrand in approximately 2018, and stated in November 2019 that she was part of the university's Golden Key Honour Society.

Career

2019–present: Elements 
Elaine uploaded her debut single, "Slip Away" onto SoundCloud in February 2019, before officially self-releasing it in April 2019. Her follow-up single, "I Just Wanna Know" was released in August 2019. Elaine was the first South African artist to be part of Spotify's Radar artist program alongside Taiylor Manson . She released her debut EP, Elements, on 29 September 2019. The 7-track EP was produced by Clxrity alongside Elizee from South African hip-hop duo Elizee and Malachi and was described by OkayAfrica as "a mellow blend of trap-soul and R&B with incisive explorations of adolescent love." The EP was successful on streaming charts, helping Elaine clock one million accumulative streams within two weeks of its initial release. She was deemed as Apple Music's New Artist Spotlight after Elements reached No. 1 on the album chart in South Africa. At one point in February 2020, all seven songs from Elements simultaneously placed in the top 10 of the national Apple Music R&B/Soul songs chart. The EP, spawned the single "You're The One", which also topped both iTunes and Apple Music single charts. The single earned Elaine both her radio debut and first number one on the Metro FM Top 40, as well as several weeks atop both the 947 Top 40, and KFM Top 40. Her debut music video for "You're The One" was released in early April 2020 and gained approximately 100 thousand views within 24 hours of its initial release. As of late April 2020, Elaine continues to "dominate" South African music charts. Elements was certified Platinum by the Recording Industry of South Africa (RISA) in July 2020. The EP was also nominated for Best R&B/Soul Album at the 26th South African Music Awards. Elaine was signed to Columbia Records in August 2020.

In November 2020, she was nominated for Best Female Southern Africa at 2020 African Muzik Magazine Awards.

On 12 May 2021, she released a single "Right Now ".

On 24 March 2022, she released her highly anticipated single "Shine". She first teased the song on TikTok and Instagram. In September 2022, Elaine had released her latest single, “Deja vu”.

Artistry 
Elaine's musical style regarding genre has been described as trap-soul (a blend of trap and soul music), alternative R&B, contemporary R&B, and neo-soul. She has cited R&B singers such as Lauryn Hill and Beyoncé as her biggest inspirations. Elaine's musical style has been compared to that of Tsakani Mhinga and H.E.R., as well as Jhené Aiko and Summer Walker.

Discography

Extended plays

Singles

Awards and nominations

References 

1999 births
Living people
People from Pretoria
21st-century South African women singers
South African singer-songwriters
Contemporary R&B singers
Neo soul singers
South African Venda people
University of the Witwatersrand alumni
Columbia Records artists